The Telavi Open is a tournament for professional female tennis players. The event is classified as a $25,000 ITF Women's Circuit tournament. It has been held on outdoor clay courts in Telavi, Georgia, since 2007. From 2011 until 2013 the tournament was classified as a $50,000 event on the ITF calendar.

Past finals

Singles

Doubles

References

External links
 Official website
 ITF search

 
ITF Women's World Tennis Tour
Clay court tennis tournaments
Tennis tournaments in Georgia (country)
Recurring sporting events established in 2007